Dand Nayak is a 1998 Bollywood action drama film directed by Sikander Bharti starring Naseeruddin Shah, Manek Bedi, Ayesha Jhulka, Inder Kumar, Shilpa Shirodkar and Paresh Rawal.

Plot

Bankhelal Chaurasia comes to Bombay from Uttar Pradesh and starts a business of raising and keeping buffalos and selling their milk. He then advances into petty crime and works his way up to major crimes, such as dealing drugs, land grabbing, smuggling and murder.
He soon becomes the Bombay underworld as the kingpin. Inspector Vishal want to punish Bankhelal by hook or by crook, and he also has a reputation in succeeding no matter what the consequences are. A lady journalist who always prints Bankelal's underworld dealings is also threatened and happens to be Inspector Vishal's wife.

Cast

Naseeruddin Shah as Inspector Vishal
Shilpa Shirodkar as Journalist
Manek Bedi as Suraj
Ayesha Jhulka as Naina
Inder Kumar as Karan
Tisca Chopra as Priya Arora
Paresh Rawal as Bankhelal Chaurasia
Satyen Kappu
Arun Bali as Bakshi,Police Commissioner

Soundtrack
Lyrics were penned by Anand Bakshi.

External links

References 

1998 films
Films scored by Rajesh Roshan
1990s Hindi-language films
Indian action films
1998 action films
Hindi-language action films